Thomas Jutten is the name of:

 Thomas William Jutten (1861–1955), mayor of Hamilton, Ontario, Canada
 Thomas Jutten (cricketer) (1758–1826), English cricketer